Notts, Lincs & Derbyshire 2 was a tier 10 English Rugby Union league with teams from Nottinghamshire, Lincolnshire and Derbyshire taking part.  Promoted teams moved up to Notts, Lincs & Derbyshire 1 and relegated teams dropped to Notts, Lincs & Derbyshire 3.  

At the end of the 1999–00 season the Notts, Lincs & Derbyshire leagues were merged with the Leicestershire leagues.  This meant that Notts, Lincs & Lincolnshire 2 was cancelled after 13 seasons and all teams transferred into the new Notts, Lincs & Derbyshire/Leicestershire leagues.

Original teams

When league rugby began in 1987 this division contained the following teams:

Amber Valley
Dronfield
East Retford
Ilkeston
Keyworth
Market Rasen & Louth
Nottingham Casuals
Nottinghamshire Constabulary
Nottinghamians
Sleaford
Spalding

Notts, Lincs & Derbyshire 2 honours

Notts, Lincs & Derbyshire 2 (1987–1992)

The original Notts, Lincs & Derbyshire 2 was a tier 8 league.  Promotion was to Notts, Lincs & Derbyshire 1 and relegation to Notts, Lincs & Derbyshire 3.

Notts, Lincs & Derbyshire 2 (1992–1993)

Restructuring of the Midlands leagues saw Notts, Lincs & Derbyshire 2 drop two levels to become a tier 10 league.  Promotion continued to Notts, Lincs & Derbyshire 1 and relegation to Notts, Lincs & Derbyshire 3.

Notts, Lincs & Derbyshire 2 (1993–1996)

The top six teams from Midlands 1 and the top six from North 1 were combined to create National 5 North, meaning that Notts, Lincs & Derbyshire 2 dropped another level to become a tier 11 league.  Promotion continued to Notts, Lincs & Derbyshire 1 and relegation to Notts, Lincs & Derbyshire 3.

Notts, Lincs & Derbyshire 2 (1996–2000)

At the end of the 1995–96 season National 5 North was discontinued and Notts, Lincs & Derbyshire 2 returned to being a tier 10 league.  Promotion continued to Notts, Lincs & Derbyshire 1 and relegation to Notts, Lincs & Derbyshire 3. At the end of the 1999–00 season Notts, Lincs & Derbyshire 2 was cancelled due to Midlands league restructuring and teams transferred into the new Notts, Lincs & Derbyshire/Leicestershire leagues.

Number of league titles

Amber Valley (1)
Bakewell Mannerians (1)
Barton & District (1)
Belper (1)
Boots Athletic (1)
Buxton (1)
Dronfield (1)
East Leake (1)
East Retford (1)
Glossop (1)
Leesbrook (1)
Sleaford (1)
Worksop (1)

Notes

See also
Notts, Lincs & Derbyshire 1
Notts, Lincs & Derbyshire 3
Notts, Lincs & Derbyshire 4
Notts, Lincs & Derbyshire 5
Midlands RFU
Notts, Lincs & Derbyshire RFU
English rugby union system
Rugby union in England

References

External links
 NLD RFU website

10
Rugby union in Nottinghamshire
Rugby union in Derbyshire
Rugby union in Lincolnshire
Sports leagues established in 1987
Sports leagues disestablished in 2000